Shreevats Goswami (born 18 May 1989) is an Indian cricketer. He is a left-handed batsman and wicketkeeper. He was born in Liluah in Howrah city, the twin city of Kolkata, West Bengal. He started playing cricket at the age of 11. He played domestic cricket for Under-19 Bengal. During the Under-19 Tri-nation series in South Africa in January 2008, he scored 97 against South Africa and 104 against Bangladesh. In the 2008 U/19 Cricket World Cup in Malaysia, he scored 58 runs in one of the league matches and 51 in the semi-final against New Zealand.

Goswami has played for Royal Challengers Bangalore in the first three seasons of the Indian Premier League.was named emerging player of the tournament in 2008.In 4th edition of IPL, Goswami was kept in the uncapped player pool and was signed by the Kolkata Knight Riders. In 5th edition of IPL, he moved to the Rajasthan Royals.

Goswami toiled hard in the domestic circuit for Bengal but Wriddhiman Saha's presence meant that he was always the reserve keeper,yet he managed to surpass 8000 domestic runs and 200 dismissals. he had a really good Ranji Trophy season in 2016-17 and registered his career best score of 227 which is highest by a Bengal keeper .

He was selected for the Board President's XI side for playing a practice match against Steve Smith's Australia in September 2017 where he was top scorer with 44 runs. His good performances has also earned him a spot for India A's ODI series against New Zealand A but got limited opportunities.

In January 2018, he was bought by the Sunrisers Hyderabad and retained by the side for three years.

References

1989 births
Indian cricketers
Royal Challengers Bangalore cricketers
Kolkata Knight Riders cricketers
Rajasthan Royals cricketers
Sunrisers Hyderabad cricketers
Bengal cricketers
India Blue cricketers
East Zone cricketers
Living people
Wicket-keepers